Samuel or Sam Dent may refer to:

Samuel Dent (politician), see List of colonial governors of Grenada
Sam Dent, character in The Americano (1955 film)
Sam Dent, musician in The Dear Hunter
 Dr Samuel Dent PFHEA, Head of Academic Quality Development at Staffordshire University